Platelet factor 4 (PF4) is a small cytokine belonging to the CXC chemokine family that is also known as chemokine (C-X-C motif) ligand 4 (CXCL4) . This chemokine is released from alpha-granules of activated platelets during platelet aggregation, and promotes blood coagulation by moderating the effects of heparin-like molecules. Due to these roles, it is predicted to play a role in wound repair and inflammation. It is usually found in a complex with proteoglycan.

Genomics 

The gene for human PF4 is located on human chromosome 4.

Function 

Platelet factor-4 is a 70-amino acid protein that is released from the alpha-granules of activated platelets and binds with high affinity to heparin. Its major physiologic role appears to be neutralization of heparin-like molecules on the endothelial surface of blood vessels, thereby inhibiting local antithrombin activity and promoting coagulation. As a strong chemoattractant for neutrophils and fibroblasts, PF4 probably has a role in inflammation and wound repair.

PF4 is chemotactic for neutrophils, fibroblasts and monocytes, and interacts with a splice variant of the chemokine receptor CXCR3, known as CXCR3-B.

Clinical significance 

The heparin:PF4 complex is the antigen in heparin-induced thrombocytopenia (HIT), an idiosyncratic autoimmune reaction to the administration of the anticoagulant heparin. PF4 autoantibodies have also been found in patients with thrombosis and features resembling HIT but no prior administration of heparin. Antibodies against PF4 have been implicated in cases of thrombosis and thrombocytopenia subsequent to vaccination with the Oxford–AstraZeneca or the Janssen COVID-19 vaccine. This phenomenon has been termed vaccine-induced immune thrombotic thrombocytopenia (VITT). Changes in the expression of PF4 have also been associated with symptoms of long COVID.

It is increased in patients with systemic sclerosis that also have interstitial lung disease.

The  human platelet factor 4 kills malaria parasites within erythrocytes by selectively lysing the parasite's digestive vacuole.

See also 
 Platelet-activating factor
 Platelet-derived growth factor

References

Further reading

External links 
 

Cytokines
Proteoglycans